Šebreki is a settlement in Karlovac County, Croatia. As of the 2001 census, it has 0 residents.

References 

Ghost towns in Croatia